The Museum of the American Railroad, formerly known as the Age of Steam Railroad Museum, is a railroad museum in Frisco, Texas. The museum has more than 70 pieces of steam, diesel, passenger, and freight railroad equipment; guests may walk through some of the equipment on guided tours.

History
The museum began as a small exhibit at the State Fair of Texas in 1963, and continued as a staple of the annual fair. It officially became a museum in 1986. It remained at its original site at Fair Park until November 2011. The museum has fully moved to Frisco, Texas; the move was based on a strategic plan, called Visions 2006, which called for a comprehensive reorganization of the museum, including new facilities, new governance and new programs. The museum's offices and some exhibits are temporarily housed at the Frisco Heritage Museum while construction continues on the museum's new location two blocks south. 

TrainTopia, a G scale model train layout, opened in July 2018 in the Frisco Discovery Center next to the museum's site.

Collection

The collection includes:

Locomotives
Steam

Union Pacific #4018: Big Boy 4-8-8-4 (Built by ALCO in 1941)
St. Louis-San Francisco Railway #4501: 4-8-4 (Baldwin, 1942) Famous for pulling the Meteor
St. Louis-San Francisco Railway #1625: 2-10-0 (ALCO, 1918)
Dallas Union Terminal #7: 0-6-0 (Baldwin, 1923)

Diesel

Southern Pacific #2379: Fairbanks Morse H12-44 Built 1956
Colorado & Wyoming #1107: Baldwin VO-1000 Built 1943
Union Pacific #6913: EMD DDA40X Built 1969
United States Army #8000: ALCO RSD-1 Built 1942 (Originally an ALCO RS-1 built for New York, Susquehanna & Western as #231, rebuilt by ALCO as one of the first RSD-1s) 
Santa Fe #49: EMD F7 Built 1952 (formerly Canadian National #9167, repainted into Santa Fe Red Warbonnet colors in 2006)
Santa Fe #97: EMD SDFP45 Built 1967
Santa Fe #M-160: Doodlebug Built by J. G. Brill Company in 1931. Re-engined in 1952 by AT&SF with an EMD 6-567B.
Santa Fe #2404: EMC NW2, built in July, 1939
Santa Fe #2260: Baldwin Locomotive Works DS4-4-1000, built February, 1948
Santa Fe #608: Fairbanks-Morse H12-44, built November, 1951
Santa Fe #59L: American Locomotive Company PA-1 Built 1948, now under restoration. Also known as Delaware and Hudson Railway #16 and Ferrocarriles Nacionales de México #DH-16
Santa Fe #2428: Santa Fe CF7
Santa Fe #2447: Santa Fe CF7
Asarco #10: Whitcomb Locomotive Company 1945 Class 8-DM-67 (21  inch (Hunt) gauge)
Southern Pacific #MW8209: EMD F7B 1949 (Originally SP #6151C, renumbered when converted for snow plow service)
Vulcan Materials Company Plymouth Locomotive Works: Model ML8 1943 (30-ton)

Electric

 Pennsylvania Railroad #4903: GG1

Passenger equipment
Sleepers

Amtrak #2997: (Ex-AT&SF 1642 "Pine Ring") Budd 10-Roomette, 6-Double bedroom, Built 1950
Amtrak #2913: "Pacific Gardens" (Ex-UP #1417) Budd Originally a 10-Roomette, 6-Double bedroom. Converted to crew lounge/dorm by Amtrak, Built 1950
Amtrak #2090: Budd Slumbercoach Built 1959. Originally Missouri Pacific #699 "Southland" then bought by Northern Pacific and ran as #329 "Loch Tarbet". 
Amtrak #2532: (Ex-B&O 7102 "Gull") Budd 16-Duplex roomette, 4-Double bedroom, Built 1954
Pullman Company "Glengyle" :7-Compartment, 2- Drawing Room, Earliest known surviving heavyweight all steel sleeping car, built by Pullman in 1911
Pullman Company "Goliad": 12-Open section, 1-Drawing room, Built 1926. Served almost exclusively on Southern Pacific's Sunset Limited. One of the first cars air-conditioned in the 1930s
Pullman Company "Glen Nevis": 6-Compartment, 3-Drawing Room, Built 1925
Pullman Company "McQuaig": 12-Open section, 1-Drawing room, Built 1925

Coaches

Santa Fe #3197: chair-observation  Pullman Company 1940
Texas and Pacific Railway #1143: chair car  Pullman Company 1920
St. Louis-San Francisco Railway #759: chair car American Car and Foundry Company 1912

Lounges

Santa Fe #3231: parlor-club car Pullman Company 1914
Santa Fe #1363: Lounge-dormitory-barbershop San Bartolo, Pullman Company 1926

Diners

Santa Fe #1550: Lunch counter diner  Budd Company 1948
Santa Fe #1554: Lunch counter diner  Budd Company 1948
Missouri-Kansas-Texas Railroad #438: dining car American Car and Foundry Company 1937

Other

Fort Worth and Denver Railway Business car:- Texland, Pullman Company 1900, Originally Colorado & Southern Railway observation car.
Texas and Pacific Railway Railway Post Office-Baggage Car #916: Pullman Company 1918

Transit Equipment 
Metra Electric District (Ex-Illinois Central Railroad) "Stream-Liner" Built by St. Louis Car Company (First order #1501-1630, 1971-1972) and Bombardier Transportation (Second order #1631-1666, 1978-1979)

 1548
 1552
 1601 
 1608
 1661
 And five more

Freight equipment
Kansas City Southern #7460: single sheathed boxcar 
Kansas City Southern Lines #107859: boxcar
Lone Star Producing Company #1817: tank car 
Western Pacific Railroad #68652: boxcar 
Texas & Pacific Railroad #X4446: boxcar 
Packers Car Line (Armour & Company) PCX 4063: Ice Refrigerator Car 
Packers Car Line (Armour & Company) PCX 4005: Ice Refrigerator Car 
Genesee & Wyoming Railroad #GNWR 1032: Mechanical Refrigerator Car

Cabooses
Santa Fe Caboose #999311: Built 1949
Santa Fe Caboose #1618
Cotton Belt #2332: drover caboose Built 1920
Richmond, Fredericksburg and Potomac Railroad #932: Built 1971

Speeders/Handcars 

 Union Pacific Railroad #MT14444M: Fairmont Railway Motors Model M-14 Built 1977 (Onan 2 cyl. engine)
 Track-Work Incorporated (Ex-Chicago Rock Island & Pacific Railroad) #RIMC 915: Fairmont Railway Motors Model S2E Built 1955 (Fairmont 1 cyl. engine)
 Gifford-Hill & Company #H109: handcar, Donated 1964

Structures
Houston & Texas Central Railroad Depot, ca. 1905
Houston & Texas Central Railroad Handcar Shed, Dallas, TX ca. 1905
Gulf, Colorado, and Santa Fe Railroad Interlocking Tower 19

Road vehicles 

 Railway Express Agency Ford 1-ton box truck, 1941

Formerly owned equipment 

 Texas & Northern bobber caboose
 Massachusetts Bay Transit Authority PCC #3329
 New Orleans Public Service Incorporated Electric Streetcar #919
 Econo-Rail Inc., Procter & Gamble Plant, Dallas, TX #PG 13: S-2 Diesel Locomotive 
 Econo-Rail Inc., Houston, TX #E-R 10: S-6 Diesel Locomotive 
 New York Central Railroad Company #3001: 4-8-2 
 Texas & Pacific Railway #638: 2-10-4 steam locomotive

TrainTopia
The museum has a permanent exhibit called "TrainTopia – A Railroad Odyssey in Miniature" in the Frisco Discovery Center next to the museum.  This is a 2,500-square-foot professionally-built  G scale model railroad layout donated to the museum by the Sanders family; a $300,000 donation from the Ryan Foundation funded moving the layout and preparing the exhibit space.  The scene spans Texas to Arizona, and includes details such as the dramatic rock formations of the Four Corners region near New Mexico, an animated downtown Dallas street scene, the Palo Duro Drive-In Theater with a movie playing, a West Texas refinery, and working saw mills in Colorado.  A custom light show changes the exhibit from day to night. The layout has hundreds of locomotives and cars, most made by LGB in Germany.

Gallery

Exhibit at Fair Park until November 2011

See also
List of museums in North Texas

References

External links

Museum of the American Railroad

Museums in Collin County, Texas
Railroad museums in Texas
Frisco, Texas
Museums established in 1986
1986 establishments in Texas